Downs is a townland in County Westmeath, Ireland.

Downs is one of 11 townlands of the civil parish of Taghmon in the barony of Corkaree in the Province of Leinster.

The neighbouring townlands are: Rathcorbally to the north, Balreagh to the east and south, Clonkill to the south and Monkstown to the west.

In the 1911 census of Ireland there were 5 houses and 26 inhabitants in the townland.

References

External links
Map of Downs at openstreetmap.org
Downs at the IreAtlas Townland Data Base
Downs at Townlands.ie
Downs at The Placenames Database of Ireland

Townlands of County Westmeath